WMNP (99.3 FM, "Mixx 99.3") is an American radio station licensed to serve the community of Block Island, Rhode Island. The station is owned by 3G Broadcasting, Inc. Its studio is located in Newport, Rhode Island. WMNP broadcasts a Top 40 (CHR) music format that targets southern Rhode Island, Southeastern Connecticut and the South Coast of Massachusetts.

History
Established in 1984 as WITQ, it officially signed on in October 1988 as WBLQ.  The WBLQ callsign is now on 1230 AM owned by former WBLQ alum Chris DiPaola. The format was automated adult contemporary until the early 1990s when the station shifted its programming to an eclectic album rock format. In 1996 the station was sold to Bear Broadcasting and the callsign changed to WERI-FM. The operation was moved to Newport in 1999 when Astro Tele-communications rebranded the station as Swing FM running a swing, jazz and standards format which WJZS were the calls. The format shifted to adult contemporary again as 99.3 The Bridge, then rebranded as Variety 99.3. In April 2013 3G Broadcasting Inc. purchased WJZS and WADK.

On May 3, 2013 under the new ownership of 3G Broadcasting with program director Matt Girard, WJZS changed  formats to a contemporary hit radio/Top 40 format, branded as "Mixx 99.3" along with a new callsign: WMNP.

Previous logo

References

External links

MNP
Contemporary hit radio stations in the United States
New Shoreham, Rhode Island
Washington County, Rhode Island
Radio stations established in 1988
1988 establishments in Rhode Island